Novaya is a rural locality (a village) in Pervomayskoye Rural Settlement, Chagodoshchensky District, Vologda Oblast, Russia. The population was 4 as of 2002.

Geography 
Ignashino is the nearest rural locality.

References 

Rural localities in Chagodoshchensky District